Yanks Music (May 31, 1993 - May 15, 2008) was an American National Champion Thoroughbred racehorse and the winner of the 1996 Alabama Stakes.

Career

Yanks Music's first race was on November 5th, 1995 at New York's Aqueduct Racetrack where she came in first. 

She then won her next two races at the Aqueduct track in November 1995 and April 1996. She competed in her first Graded stakes race, the 1996 Acorn Stakes, coming in 2nd place. The filly then won her first Graded stakes race, the Mother Goose Stakes, on June 22nd, 1996. To that she added the 1996 Alabama Stakes on August 17th and then won the Ruffian Stakes on September 14th. 

Yanks Music won the final race of her career when she captured the 1996 Beldame Stakes.

Death
Foaling a bout with colic, Yanks Music was euthanized on May 15th 2008 due to intestinal problems.

Pedigree

References

1993 racehorse births
2008 racehorse deaths
Thoroughbred racehorses
American Champion racehorses 
Racehorses bred in Kentucky
Racehorses trained in the United States
Eclipse Award winners